Muhammad Hanif bin Mat Dzahir (born 15 January 1994) is Malaysian professional footballer who plays as central midfielder.

Career statistics

Club

References

External links
 

1994 births
People from Kedah
Living people
Malaysian footballers
Kedah Darul Aman F.C. players
Malaysia Super League players
Association football midfielders